Camden is an electoral district of the Legislative Assembly in the Australian state of New South Wales in Sydney's south-west. It is currently represented by Peter Sidgreaves of the Liberal Party.

It currently includes the suburbs of Austral, Badgerys Creek, Bickley Vale, Bringelly, Camden, Camden Park, Camden South, Catherine Field, Cawdor, Cobbitty, Currans Hill, Elderslie, Ellis Lane, Gledswood Hills, Grasmere, Greendale, Gregory Hills, Harrington Park, Kirkham, Leppington, Luddenham, Mount Annan, Narellan, Narellan Vale, Oran Park, Rossmore, Smeaton Grange, Spring Farm, Wallacia and West Hoxton.

History
Camden was originally created in 1859, replacing part of West Camden and named after the town of Camden or Camden County, which includes Camden, the Southern Highlands and the Illawarra. It elected two members from 1859 to 1889 and three members from 1889 to 1894, when multi-member electorates were abolished. It was abolished in 1920, with the introduction of proportional representation and absorbed into Cumberland. It was recreated in 1981.
Except in 1984-91 and 1995-2003, Camden in its second incarnation, has been held by the government party.

Camden was evident as a bellwether seat at the 1991 election when the ALP lost the seat to the Liberal Party despite the former party making huge gains at that election which was close but not enough for them to win the election. If the ALP had retained Camden in 1991, the party would have been in a strong position to form a minority government when it then won The Entrance by-election in 1992.

Members for Camden

Election results

References

Camden
1859 establishments in Australia
Camden
1920 disestablishments in Australia
Camden
1981 establishments in Australia
Camden